How to Solve it by Computer is a computer science book by R. G. Dromey, first published by Prentice-Hall in 1982.
It is occasionally used as a textbook, especially in India.

It is an introduction to the whys of algorithms and data structures.
Features of the book:
The design factors associated with problems 
The creative process behind coming up with innovative solutions for algorithms and data structures
The line of reasoning behind the constraints, factors and the design choices made.

The very fundamental algorithms portrayed by this book are mostly presented in pseudocode and/or Pascal notation.

See also
How to Solve It, by George Pólya, the author's mentor and inspiration for writing the book.

References

1982 non-fiction books
Algorithms
Computer science books
Heuristics
Problem solving
Prentice Hall books